Trilirata macmurdensis is a species of predatory sea snail, a marine gastropod mollusk in the family Zerotulidae.

Distribution

Description 
The maximum recorded shell length is 2.5 mm.

Habitat 
Minimum recorded depth is 270 m. Maximum recorded depth is 280 m.

References

Zerotulidae
Gastropods described in 1911